Dendromurinae is a subfamily of rodents in the family Nesomyidae and superfamily Muroidea.  The dendromurines are currently restricted to Africa, as is the case for all extant members of the family Nesomyidae. The authorship of the subfamily has been attributed to both Alston, 1876, and (incorrectly) to G. M. Allen, 1939.

Two genera, Dendromus and Steatomys, are relatively common throughout most of sub-Saharan Africa.  The remaining genera are relatively rare and have restricted geographic distributions.

The link rat, Deomys ferugineus, has been traditionally placed in this subfamily, but molecular phylogenetic studies have shown that it is more related to the spiny mice, genus Acomys.  The link rat is now placed in the family Muridae and subfamily Deomyinae. Only two of the currently recognized dendromurine genera, Dendromus and Steatomys, have been studied in molecular analyses.  Considering how distinct these genera are from one another, the placement of all other dendromurine genera should be considered tentative pending closer examination. Another rare genus of "dendromurines", Leimacomys, has recently been placed in a new subfamily (Leimacomyinae) in the family Muridae (Musser and Carleton, 2005).

Fossils attributed to the Dendromurinae are known from Asia as early as 15 million years ago.  It has been thought that dendromurines invaded Africa from there and became extinct in Asia due to competition with other muroids.  The same may be holding true at present in Africa as the dendromurines have declined there since the invasion of murines and other muroids.

The subfamily Dendromurinae contains 6 genera and 25 species.

Classification
Subfamily Dendromurinae - Climbing mice
Genus Dendromus - Climbing mice
Remarkable climbing mouse, Dendromus insignis
Mount Kahuzi climbing mouse, Dendromus kahuziensis
Monard's African climbing mouse, Dendromus leucostomus
Lovat's climbing mouse, Dendromus lovati
Gray climbing mouse, Dendromus melanotis
Brant's climbing mouse, Dendromus mesomelas
Banana climbing mouse, Dendromus messorius
Chestnut climbing mouse, Dendromus mystacalis
Kivu climbing mouse, Dendromus nyasae (kivu)
Nyika climbing mouse, Dendromus nyikae
Cameroon climbing mouse, Dendromus oreas
Dendromus ruppi
Vernay's climbing mouse, Dendromus vernayi
Genus Megadendromus
Nikolaus's mouse, Megadendromus nikolausi
Genus Dendroprionomys
Velvet climbing mouse, Dendroprionomys rousseloti
Genus Prionomys
Dollman's climbing mouse, Prionomys batesi
Genus Malacothrix
Gerbil mouse, Malacothrix typica
Genus Steatomys - Fat mice
Bocage's African fat mouse, Steatomys bocagei
Northwestern fat mouse, Steatomys caurinus
Dainty fat mouse, Steatomys cuppedius
Jackson's fat mouse, Steatomys jacksoni
Kreb's fat mouse, Steatomys krebsii
Pousargues's African fat mouse, Steatomys opimus
Tiny fat mouse, Steatomys parvus
Fat mouse, Steatomys pratensis

References
Kingdon, J. 1997. The Kingdon Field Guide to African Mammals. Academic Press Limited, London.

Steppan, S. J., R. A. Adkins, and J. Anderson. 2004. Phylogeny and divergence date estimates of rapid radiations in muroid rodents based on multiple nuclear genes. Systematic Biology, 53:533-553.

 
Nesomyid rodents
Mammal subfamilies